Thompson Creek is a stream in Houston County, in the U.S. state of Minnesota. It is a tributary to the Root River.

Thompson Creek was named for brothers Edward Thompson and Clark W. Thompson, early settlers.

See also
List of rivers of Minnesota

References

Rivers of Houston County, Minnesota
Rivers of Minnesota
Southern Minnesota trout streams
Driftless Area